Florence Ashton Marshall (Mrs. Julian Marshall) bite Thomas (30 March 1843 – 1922) was an English writer, composer and conductor. She was born on 30 March 1843 in Rome, Italy, the daughter of Vicar Canon Thomas of All Hallows Barking by the Tower, and studied music at the Royal Academy of Music with William Sterndale Bennett, John Goss and G.A. Macfarren.

Life
Thomas married businessman, writer, and music collector Julian Marshall on 7 October 1864 and had three daughters. Like her husband, she contributed to Grove's Dictionary, though on a lesser scale. Some of her articles survived unchanged into the fifth edition.

She was elected an associate of the Philharmonic Society and conducted the South Hampstead Orchestra. The orchestra was substantial enough to perform a Brahms symphony under her direction and the Saint-Saëns violin concerto with Mischa Elman as the soloist. She and her husband were founding members of the Musical Association. Marshall died in 1922 and the last of her husband's collection was sold that year.

Works
Florence Marshall composed solo songs, part songs, educational pieces, and operettas. Selected works include:
The Masked Shepherd, operetta (1879)  
Prince Sprite, fairy operetta (1897)

Marshall published a biography of Handel in Hueffer's Great Musicians series in 1883, and Life and Letters of Mary Wollstonecraft Shelley in 1889.

References

1843 births
1922 deaths
19th-century classical composers
20th-century classical composers
English classical composers
Women classical composers
20th-century English composers
20th-century English women musicians
19th-century British composers
20th-century women composers
19th-century women composers
20th-century British conductors (music)
Women conductors (music)